Robert Wallace Webb (November 2, 1909 – March 4, 1984) was a professor of geology at the University of California, Los Angeles, and during World War II was Coordinator of Veterans Affairs for the University of California system.  After World War II, Santa Barbara State College became a branch of the University of California and he transferred there in 1948 where he was one of the original professors of earth science at the University of California, Santa Barbara (UCSB).

He was particularly interested in mineralogy and in spite of many different administrative assignments he always returned to the classroom.  He loved mentoring students and enjoyed teaching beginning course interesting lower division students to major Geology.  He loved the Sierra Nevada where he was in his element.

Honours and awards
The Robert Wallace Webb Award is given in his name by the Far Western Section of the National Association of Geoscience Teachers.  The Earth Sciences building at the UCSB campus in Goleta is named Webb Hall for him and his contributions to the Earth Science program and students at UCSB.

Work as an Author
He, with his colleague, Joseph Murdoch, were long-time editors/writers of Minerals of California.

He is the author, with Robert Norris, of Geology of California, now out of print but in many libraries and available on the internet from used book sources.

Family
Married to Evelyn Elaine Gourley
3 Sons all retired (2014)
Robert Ian Arthur Webb
Leland Frederick Webb
Donald Gourley Webb
All 3 are graduates of UCSB and all have PhD degrees.   Ian a teacher (Electronics, Engineering, Math, Computer Info Systems) at West Valley College in Saratoga, CA
Lee a teacher (Math & Math Education) at California State College, Bakersfield
Don a School Psychologist for the Reno School System

Death
He died near Mammoth Lakes area while leading a UCSB Geology Field Trip which was one of his volunteer twice a year pleasures during retirement.

References

1909 births
1984 deaths
20th-century American geologists
University of California, Los Angeles faculty
University of California, Santa Barbara faculty